The Munich Eye is an English language weekly newspaper published in Munich, Germany.

History and profile
The paper was started in July 2013 with the name The Munich Times and was later renamed as The Munich Eye. It is published every Thursday and is staffed by native English-language editors living in Germany. It is part of the Eye Newspapers.

The paper, of which the editor-in-chief is William Smyth, serves English-speaking people in Munich and in the Bavarian region. It offers international and national news, sports and events. The paper's website is updated daily.

References

External links
 

2013 establishments in Germany
English-language newspapers published in Europe
Newspapers published in Munich
Newspapers established in 2013
Weekly newspapers published in Germany